The music of Nauru demonstrates its Micronesian heritage.

National anthem

The national anthem of Nauru is "Nauru Bwiema" ("Song of Nauru").  Margaret Hendrie wrote the words; Laurence Henry Hicks composed the music.

Noted contemporary composer

Baron Waqa, who has also served as a government minister, has been noted for his musical composition activity.